James J. Reed was an American wrestling, football, and soccer player and coach.  He served as head coach of the United States men's national soccer team from 1959 until 1961, finishing with a record of 0–3–1.

Reed graduated from Liberty High School in Bethlehem, Pennsylvania.  He attended Lehigh University in Bethlehem from 1923 to 1927.  He spent four seasons on the school's wrestling team and three on the soccer team.  In 1928, he was selected as an alternate for the U.S. Olympic Wrestling Team.  In 1929, he became the assistant wrestling coach at Princeton University.  In September 1934, he replaced Clarence Foster as head coach, a position he held until 1963.  He compiled a 109–106–14 record as wrestling coach.  In 1938, Reed became the head soccer coach at Princeton. When he stepped down in 1966, he had compiled a 136–95–29 record.  In 1955, the National Wrestling Coaches Association awarded Reed its 25 Years of Service Award.  In the 1950s, Reed also became a part-time wrestling coach at the Hun School of Princeton.  After retiring from Princeton in 1969, he became a full-time wrestling and soccer coach at the school.  In 2007, the Hun School inducted Reed into its Athletic Hall of Fame.

During his life, Reed held numerous positions in various athletic associations.  He was the 1938 and 1947 President of the Eastern Intercollegiate Wrestling Association.  In 1942, he served as the president of the American Wrestling Coaches Association and was chairman of the NCAA Wrestling Rules Committee from 1949 to 1950.  In 1952, Reed spent a year as the chairman of the NCAA Soccer Rules Committee.  From 1960 to 1963, he was the secretary-treasurer of the Intercollegiate Soccer Football Association.  In 1962, Reed was the president of the National Soccer Coaches Association of America.  In 1971, the National Intercollegiate Soccer Officials Association inducted Reed into its Hall of Fame.  In 1972, the NSCAA presented Reed with its Honor Award.

Reed also played for the Bethlehem Panthers, an early American football team.

References

External links
 Obituary
 Article with photo of Reed
 Lehigh Wrestling: Jimmy Reed

1903 births
1994 deaths
American wrestlers
American wrestling coaches
American soccer coaches
American soccer players
Liberty High School (Bethlehem, Pennsylvania) alumni
Princeton Tigers football coaches
Princeton Tigers wrestling coaches
Lehigh Mountain Hawks men's soccer players
Lehigh Mountain Hawks wrestlers
United States men's national soccer team managers
Sportspeople from Bethlehem, Pennsylvania
Sportspeople from Pottsville, Pennsylvania
Players of American football from Pennsylvania
Soccer players from Pennsylvania
Intercollegiate Soccer Football Association
Association footballers not categorized by position
Princeton Tigers men's soccer coaches
High school soccer coaches in the United States